Saving Grace is a 1986 comedy-drama film directed by Robert M. Young, produced by Herbert F. Solow, and starring Tom Conti, Giancarlo Giannini and Edward James Olmos. It is based on a novel by Celia Gittelson with screenplay by Richard Kramer and David S. Ward under a different name.

It was the last film to be distributed by Embassy Pictures.

Plot
A year after his election, a youthful Pope (Conti) longs to be involved in ordinary people’s lives again, as he was when he was a priest.

During an audience, the Pope communicates with a deaf mute young girl whose village has no priest. Accidentally locked out of the Vatican, the Pope travels to the small impoverished and demoralized village, his identity concealed by his beard growth. He realizes that the people need to rebuild a dilapidated aqueduct but, more importantly, that they must regain their community spirit and self-sufficiency. Without expertise and, initially, only the help of some street-wise orphans, he starts construction. All this is watched skeptically by a mysterious neighbour played by Giannini and opposed by local thugs led by Ciolino (Olmos) whose ill-gotten gains depend on the village remaining overly dependent on outsiders.

Themes
Although this movie is often classified as a comedy, it has serious themes, including what it takes for a community to develop resilience and how redemption occurs.  The "cry" "heard" from a mute girl for a priest in her village comes at a time when the young Pope is going through a spiritual crisis. When he locks himself out of his lofty Vatican world, he makes his way to Montepetra (Mount of Peter, or stone) and begins to grasp his true vocation again by challenging tyranny and helping return water (baptismal grace) to the community to restore their strength. In Christian thought, there is always sacrifice of those who initially resist, then come by grace. It is a saving grace, as even the most skeptical of the community discover.

Production and release
The movie was shot in Italy: in the cities of Rome, Mantua and the ghost town of Craco.

Saving Grace premiered in the United States on May 2, 1986, and in the Philippines on April 11, 1987.

Critical reception
Walter Goodman of The New York Times said, 'There's no more engaging actor around than Tom Conti, but not even he, with the assistance of such notables of international moviedom as Giancarlo Giannini, Erland Josephson and Fernando Rey, can lift Saving Grace out of its slough of sentiment.'

References

External links

1986 films
1986 comedy films
Embassy Pictures films
Films about Christianity
Films about fictional popes
Films directed by Robert M. Young
Films set in Vatican City
1980s English-language films
American comedy-drama films
1980s American films